Kurbaan may refer to:

 Kurbaan (1991 film), an Indian film
 Kurbaan (2009 film), an Indian film